USS LST-933 was an  in the United States Navy. Like many of her class, she was not named and is properly referred to by her hull designation.

Construction
LST-933 was laid down on 23 June 1944, at Hingham, Massachusetts, by the Bethlehem-Hingham Shipyard; launched on 26 July 1944; and commissioned on 20 August 1944.

Service history
During World War II, LST-933 was assigned to the Asiatic-Pacific theater and participated in the Palawan Island landings in February and March 1945, the Mindanao Island landings in April and May 1945, and the assault and occupation of Okinawa Gunto in  June 1945.

Following the war, LST-933 performed occupation duty in the Far East until mid-February 1946. She returned to the United States and was decommissioned on 2 July 1946, and struck from the Navy list on 15 August, that same year. On 25 May 1948, the ship was sold to Hughes Bros., Inc., New York, New York, for scrapping.

Awards
LST-933 earned two battle star for World War II service.

Notes

Citations

Bibliography 

Online resources

External links
 

 

LST-542-class tank landing ships
World War II amphibious warfare vessels of the United States
Ships built in Hingham, Massachusetts
1944 ships